HD 121504 is an 8th magnitude star in the constellation of Centaurus. It is a yellow dwarf (spectral type G2V) and remarkably similar to the Sun, only slightly brighter like α Centauri A. However, it is located at a distance of about 135 light years and thus is not visible to the unaided eye; binoculars or small telescope is required to see this star.

Another component, designated as SAO 241323 has been proposed as a component of the system. However, the star is an optical binary component and in reality is a white giant star located thousands of light years away.

In 2000 the Geneva Extrasolar Planet Search Team announced the discovery of an extrasolar planet orbiting the star.

See also
 List of extrasolar planets

References

External links

Double stars
G-type main-sequence stars
121504
068162
Centaurus (constellation)
Planetary systems with one confirmed planet
Durchmusterung objects